is a Japanese footballer currently playing as a left-back.

Career statistics

Club
.

Notes

References

External links

2001 births
Living people
Japanese footballers
Komazawa University alumni
Association football defenders
J3 League players
Cerezo Osaka players
Cerezo Osaka U-23 players